Gaston is a town in Lexington County, South Carolina, United States. The population was 1,645 at the 2010 census. It is part of the Columbia, South Carolina Metropolitan Statistical Area.

History
Gaston is named for the Gaston family.

Geography
Gaston is located on the banks of Bull Swamp Creek.

Demographics

2020 census

As of the 2020 United States census, there were 1,608 people, 684 households, and 458 families residing in the town.

2000 census
As of the census of 2000, there were 1,304 people, 484 households, and 366 families residing in the town. The population density was 380.6 people per square mile (146.8/km2). There were 532 housing units at an average density of 155.3 per square mile (59.9/km2). The racial makeup of the town was 95.71% White, 1.07% African American, 0.84% Native American, 0.46% from other races, and 1.92% from two or more races. Hispanic or Latino of any race were 1.92% of the population.

There were 484 households, out of which 40.9% had children under the age of 18 living with them, 60.1% were married couples living together, 10.7% had a female householder with no husband present, and 24.2% were non-families. 19.4% of all households were made up of individuals, and 4.8% had someone living alone who was 65 years of age or older. The average household size was 2.69 and the average family size was 3.08.

In the town, the population was spread out, with 28.9% under the age of 18, 8.1% from 18 to 24, 31.9% from 25 to 44, 22.9% from 45 to 64, and 8.1% who were 65 years of age or older. The median age was 35 years. For every 100 females, there were 97.0 males. For every 100 females age 18 and over, there were 96.0 males.

The median income for a household in the town was $31,411, and the median income for a family was $32,917. Males had a median income of $27,857 versus $21,680 for females. The per capita income for the town was $13,546. About 17.1% of families and 18.2% of the population were below the poverty line, including 26.1% of those under age 18 and 9.0% of those age 65 or over.

Economy
Gaston relies mostly on business fees.

Education
Gaston area students attend schools in Lexington School District 4 and Lexington School District 2, Frances Mack Intermediate and Sandhills Middle are located in Gaston, while the Early Childhood Center, Sandhills Primary, Sandhills Elementary, Swansea High Freshmen Academy and Swansea High School are located in Neighboring Swansea, South Carolina. Parts of Gaston also attend Airport High School in West Columbia, Pine Ridge Middle School in Pine Ridge, RH Fulmer Middle School in West Columbia, and Congaree Elementary School in South Congaree.

Gaston has a public library, a branch of the Lexington County Library.

References

External links
 

Towns in Lexington County, South Carolina
Towns in South Carolina
Columbia metropolitan area (South Carolina)